DnaJ (Hsp40) homolog, subfamily C, member 9 is a protein that in humans is encoded by the DNAJC9 gene.

References

Further reading